Mark McLeod (born 27 December 1968) is a former Australian rules footballer who played three games for Richmond in the Victorian Football League (VFL) in 1989. He was recruited from Notting Hill.  He was later drafted by the Hawthorn Football Club with the 47th selection in the 1991 Pre-season Draft but did not play a league game for Hawthorn.

References

External links

Living people
1968 births
Richmond Football Club players
Australian rules footballers from Victoria (Australia)